The "Busby Babes" were the group of footballers, recruited and trained by Manchester United F.C. chief scout Joe Armstrong and assistant manager Jimmy Murphy, who progressed from the club's youth team into the first team under the management of the eponymous Matt Busby from the late 1940s and throughout the 1950s. The squad most associated with the name "babes" was that of the 1957–58 season, many of whom died in the Munich air disaster, and who, with an average age of 22, had been touted to dominate European football for the next few years.

History

The Busby Babes were notable not only for being young and gifted, but for being developed by the club itself, rather than bought from other clubs, which was customary then. The term, coined by Manchester Evening News journalist Tom Jackson in 1951, usually refers to the players who won the league championship in seasons 1955–56 and 1956–57 with an average age of 21 and 22 respectively.

Eight of the players – Roger Byrne (28), Eddie Colman (21), Mark Jones (24), Duncan Edwards (21), Liam Whelan (22), Tommy Taylor (26), David Pegg (22) and Geoff Bent (25) – died in or as a result of the Munich air disaster in February 1958, while Jackie Blanchflower (24 at the time of the crash) and senior player Johnny Berry (31 at the time of the crash) were injured to such an extent that they never played again. Berry was the senior player in the team by the time of the crash, having been signed from Birmingham City in 1951, by which time he was already 25.

A few of the players in the team at this time had actually been bought from other clubs, although one of them, goalkeeper Ray Wood, was just 18 when he joined United from Darlington in 1949. Wood's successor in the first team, Harry Gregg, signed in December 1957, was signed from Doncaster Rovers as the world's most expensive goalkeeper at the time for £23,500. Tommy Taylor had been one of the most expensive players in English football when United paid £29,999 for him as a 21-year-old from Barnsley in 1953, whereas Johnny Berry had already been at the club for two years when Taylor arrived.

Other notable "Busby Babes" include full-back Bill Foulkes, wingers Kenny Morgans and Albert Scanlon, forward Dennis Viollet, wing-half Wilf McGuinness (who later became manager of Manchester United) and forwards John Doherty, Colin Webster and Eddie Lewis. McGuinness and Webster were not on the plane when it crashed at Munich, whereas Doherty had just been sold to Leicester City.

The last remaining player from the pre-Munich side, Bobby Charlton (20 at the time of the crash), retired from playing in 1975; though he had left Manchester United two years earlier, he had continued playing as player-manager of Preston North End. As a player, he set the all-time goalscoring record for Manchester United and England, which was later broken by another United player Wayne Rooney, and his appearance record was unbroken for 35 years after his last game for United, while his England record was not broken until 2015 when Rooney scored his 50th England goal. Bill Foulkes, who retired in 1970, had still been at the club when the European Cup was finally won in 1968. 

Harry Gregg had left the club in the 1966–67 season, signing for Stoke City, who had signed Dennis Viollet from United five seasons earlier. Kenny Morgans had moved to Swansea City in 1961, having rarely played for United after the end of the 1957–58 season. Albert Scanlon was sold to Newcastle United in November 1960. Ray Wood had been sold to Huddersfield Town within a year of the Munich crash, having been unable to win back his place in the team from Harry Gregg, leaving Old Trafford around the same time as Colin Webster, who was sold to Swansea Town. Wilf McGuinness suffered a broken leg in a reserve match during the 1959–60 season and never returned to the first team, although he stayed with the club as a member of the coaching staff and spent 18 months as United's manager after the retirement of Sir Matt Busby in May 1969. Injury also ended the career of John Doherty, who played his last game for Leicester City less than a year after United sold him to the East Midlands club.

Sammy McIlroy was born in Belfast and moved to Manchester United in 1969, making him Matt Busby's final signing and "the last of the Busby Babes". Jeff Whitefoot, 89 in 2023, has also been called "the last of the Busby Babes".

See also

Fergie's Fledglings
Munich air disaster
United (2011 film)

References

Manchester United F.C.
Nicknamed groups of association football players
1951–52 in English football
1952–53 in English football
1953–54 in English football
1954–55 in English football
1955–56 in English football
1956–57 in English football
1957–58 in English football